Jarogniew Krüger (23 November 1946 – 7 March 2019) was a Polish sailor. He competed in the Tornado event at the 1980 Summer Olympics.

References

External links
 

1946 births
2019 deaths
Polish male sailors (sport)
Olympic sailors of Poland
Sailors at the 1980 Summer Olympics – Tornado
Sportspeople from Poznań